The CMS Yorkshire League was a series of rugby league divisions in the traditional county of Yorkshire.

The league was run by the British Amateur Rugby League Association (BARLA). Teams from the Yorkshire league could apply for election to the National Conference League if they meet minimum criteria.

History

Following the formation of British Amateur Rugby League Association in 1973, local District Leagues got together and pooled their resources. The Yorkshire league was formed by a merger of Castleford, Heavy Woollen, Leeds, Wakefield and York districts. There was also a West Yorkshire Sunday league formed by Castleford, Doncaster, Heavy Woollen and Leeds districts. This league became the Yorkshire Sunday League in 1994-95 before going defunct after 1995-96.

In 2012 the CMS Yorkshire league folded and all remaining teams were accepted by the Pennine League.

Structure 2011-12

Past winners

1978-79 Lock Lane
1979-80 Lock Lane
1980-81 Lock Lane
1981-82 Heworth
1982-83 Heworth
1983-84 Heworth
1984-85
1985-86 Milford Marlins
1986-87
1987-88
1988-89 Dewsbury Celtic
1989-90 
1990-91 Dewsbury Albion
1991-92
1992-93
1993-94
1994-95
1995-96
1996-97 Fryston
1997-98
1998-99 Townville
1999-2000 
2000-01
2001-02 
2002-03 East Hull
2003-04 Sharlston Rovers
2004-05 Sharlston Rovers
2005-06 
2006-07
2007-08 Hunslet Warriors
2008-09 Hunslet Warriors
2009-10 
2010-11
2011-12 Nevison Leap

See also

 British Amateur Rugby League Association
 British rugby league system
 National Conference League
 Pennine League
 North West Counties
 Cumberland League
 Hull & District League
 Barrow & District League

External links 

 Yorkshire league official website
 BARLA Official Website
 Crofton Cougars Website

BARLA competitions
Rugby league competitions in Yorkshire